Ken Tanigawa (born December 26, 1967) is an American professional golfer.

Tanigawa was born in Kobe, Japan. He played college golf at UCLA and turned professional after graduating in 1990.

Tanigawa played on the Ben Hogan Tour (now Korn Ferry Tour) in 1991 and again in 2003. His best finish was T-41 at the 2003 Price Cutter Charity Championship. He played on the Japan Golf Tour in 1996 and 1997 with a best finish of T-9 at the 1996 Mitsubishi Galant Tournament. He quit playing professionally and was re-instated as an amateur. He won a number of amateur tournaments in Arizona in the mid-2010s.

Tanigawa qualified for the 2018 PGA Tour Champions via qualifying school, competing as an amateur and turning professional again in 2018. He won on the tour at the PURE Insurance Championship in September 2018.

In January 2019, Tanigawa was awarded the 2018 PGA Tour Champions Rookie of the Year award.

On May 26, 2019, Tanigawa won a senior major tournament, the KitchenAid Senior PGA Championship at Oak Hill Country Club in Rochester, New York. Tanigawa came from three strokes behind in the final round and holed a 10-foot par putt on the 72nd hole to edge out Scott McCarron and claim victory by a single stroke.

Amateur wins
2014 Arizona Mid-Amateur
2015 Arizona Amateur, Arizona Mid-Amateur
2017 Arizona Amateur

Source:

Professional wins (3)

PGA Tour Champions wins (2)

Other wins (1)
2000 Ohio Open

Results in major championships

CUT = missed the halfway cut
Note: Tanigawa only played in the PGA Championship.

Senior major championships

Wins (1)

Results timeline

CUT = missed the halfway cut
"T" indicates a tie for a place
NT = No tournament due to COVID-19 pandemic

References

External links
 
 
 

American male golfers
UCLA Bruins men's golfers
Japan Golf Tour golfers
PGA Tour Champions golfers
Winners of senior major golf championships
Sportspeople from Kobe
Golfers from Los Angeles
People from Dublin, Ohio
1967 births
Living people